Edward James Begley Jr. (born September 16, 1949) is an American actor and environmental activist. Begley has appeared in hundreds of films, television shows, and stage performances. He played Dr. Victor Ehrlich on the television series St. Elsewhere (1982–1988). The role earned him six consecutive Primetime Emmy Award nominations and a Golden Globe Award nomination. He also co-hosted, along with wife Rachelle Carson, the green living reality show titled Living with Ed (2007–2010).

Equally prolific in cinema, Begley's films include Blue Collar (1978), An Officer and a Gentleman (1982), This Is Spinal Tap (1984), The Accidental Tourist (1988), and She-Devil (1989). He is a recurring cast member in the mockumentaries of Christopher Guest and Eugene Levy, including  Best in Show (2000), A Mighty Wind (2003), For Your Consideration (2006), and Mascots (2016). In 2020 he was cast along his wife Rachelle in the award-winning mockumentary Reboot Camp.

Early life
Begley was born in 1949 in Los Angeles, California, to Allene Jeanne Sanders and Oscar-winning film actor Ed Begley. When Begley Jr. was born, Begley Sr. was married to Amanda Huff, who died when Begley Jr. was 7 years old. Until he was 16, Begley Jr. believed that Huff was his biological mother. He only later became acquainted with Sanders, his biological mother.

Begley's paternal grandparents were Irish immigrants. He grew up in Buffalo, New York, and attended Stella Niagara Education Park, a private Catholic school in Lewiston, New York. When he was 13, the family moved back to California, where he graduated from Notre Dame High School, Sherman Oaks, a Catholic high school, and from Los Angeles Valley College in North Hollywood.

Acting career

Begley has had numerous roles in television and film. He appeared as a guest actor on Maude and had guest appearances in the 1970s series Room 222. He had recurring roles on Mary Hartman, Mary Hartman, 7th Heaven, Arrested Development, Meego and Six Feet Under and starring roles in Stephen King's Kingdom Hospital, St. Elsewhere, and Wednesday 9:30 (8:30 Central). He was in one episode of My Three Sons, playing a tall classmate of Chip's.

He has played significant roles in three of Christopher Guest's mockumentary films Best in Show, A Mighty Wind, and For Your Consideration. Additionally, Begley played Viper pilot Greenbean on the original Battlestar Galactica TV series, Boba Fett in the radio adaptation of Return of the Jedi, and Seth Gillette, a fictional Democratic U.S. senator from North Dakota on The West Wing.

From 2000 to 2016, Begley was a member of the Board of Governors of the Academy of Motion Picture Arts and Sciences. In 1996, he appeared in a TV movie called The Late Shift, where he portrayed CBS executive Rod Perth. He has guest-starred on shows such as Scrubs, Boston Legal, and Star Trek: Voyager. He had a recurring guest role in season three of Veronica Mars. He appeared in the 2008 HBO film Recount, which profiled the 2000 presidential election and its aftermath, which was decided by Florida's electoral votes after the United States Supreme Court halted the counting of the state's popular vote. Begley also made an appearance on Tim and Eric Awesome Show, Great Job! Season 3, Episode 3, as a spokesman for Cinco.

In 2003, Begley wrote and directed the musical Cesar and Ruben. It was performed at the El Portal Theatre in Los Angeles and was revived in 2007. Begley played Dr. Walter Krandall, the protagonist's former marriage counselor and fiancé of his ex-wife in the CBS sitcom Gary Unmarried.  Since 2008 he has been in a series of DirecTV commercials as a "Cable Corp Inc." executive. In 2013, he appeared on the reality television show Beverly Hills Pawn. In 2016, he began appearing in Breaking Bad prequel and spinoff Better Call Saul as Clifford Main, senior partner at the Davis & Main law firm. Beginning in 2019, he appeared in Bless This Mess for duration of the two seasons that the show ran.

Personal life
According to a feature on the Bio channel television program Celebrity Close Calls, Begley nearly died in 1972 after being stabbed multiple times while being mugged by a street gang. His attackers were teenagers who were later apprehended by the police.

Begley was diagnosed with Parkinson's Disease in 2016.

Activism

Environmental activism
Since 1970, Begley has been an environmentalist, beginning with his first electric vehicle (a Taylor-Dunn, golf cart–like vehicle), recycling, and becoming a vegan. He promotes eco-friendly products like the Toyota Prius, Envirolet composting toilets and Begley's Best Household Cleaner.

In 2008 he stated that he was paying around $300 a year in electric bills.

Noting that the suburban lawn is environmentally unsustainable, especially in Southern California, owing to water shortage, Begley has converted his own to a drought-tolerant garden composed of native California plants. He is noted for riding bicycles and using public transportation, and owns a 2003 Toyota RAV4 EV electric-powered vehicle.

Begley's hybrid electric bicycle was often featured on his television show Living With Ed. Begley also spoofed his own environmentalist beliefs on "Homer to the Max", an episode of The Simpsons by showing himself using a nonpolluting go-kart that is powered by his "own sense of self-satisfaction" and on an episode of Dharma and Greg. Later, he appeared in "Gone Maggie Gone", another episode of The Simpsons, in Season 20. In the episode, during a solar eclipse, he drives a solar-powered car that stops running on train tracks as a train approaches, but the train also stops because it is an Ed Begley Jr. Solar Powered Train. According to another of Groening's animated comedy series, Futurama, Begley's electric motor is "the most evil propulsion system ever conceived" as stated in "The Honking" (19 minutes in).

Begley and friend Bill Nye are in a competition to see who can have the lowest carbon footprint.

In 2009, Begley appeared in the Earth Day edition of The Price Is Right. He announced the final showcase, which included an electric bicycle, a solar-powered golf cart and a Toyota Prius.

Begley was featured during The Jay Leno Show'''s Green Car Challenge. Various celebrities drove an electric Ford Focus automobile and tried to set records on an outdoor track. During the second lap, cutouts of Begley and Al Gore would pop out, and if the celebrity had hit either of them, one second was added to his or her time.

Begley is the author of Living Like Ed: A Guide to the Eco-Friendly Life (2008) and Ed Begley Jr.'s Guide to Sustainable Living: Learning to Conserve Resources and Manage an Eco-Conscious Life (2009) both published by Random House.Ed Begley Jr. Author Bookshelf - Random House - Books - Audiobooks - Ebooks. Random House. Retrieved on January 14, 2014. He also wrote A Vegan Survival Guide for the Holidays (2014) with Jerry James Stone.

Affiliations
 Coalition for Clean Air
 Environmental Media Association
 Santa Monica Mountains Conservancy
 The American Oceans Campaign
 League of Conservation Voters
 Environmental Research Foundation
 Walden Woods Project
 Thoreau Institute
 Earth Communications Office
 Solar Living Institute
 TreePeople
 Friends of the Earth
 Sequoia ForestKeeper
 Green Wish
 Orang Utan Republik

From 2007 to 2010, Begley and his wife Rachelle Carson starred in their own reality television series, Living with Ed on HGTV and Discovery's Planet Green channel. In 2013 he, his wife and daughter Hayden filmed "On Begley Street", a Web series chronicling the deconstruction of his current home and the "building of North America's greenest, most sustainable home".

He received the Thomas Alva Edison Award for Energy Independence from the American Jewish Congress, the first one to be presented. Begley has been a leader in this field and was recognized in November 2007 for his lifelong work in environmentalism.

Political
Begley was also on the advisory committee for the group 2004 Racism Watch, founded by fellow actor Ed Asner. The group was formed to respond to the advertisement campaign of the George W. Bush/Dick Cheney presidential campaign that they claimed was encouraging racism. The advertisement in question, "100 Days", made a reference to terrorism and terrorists while highlighting a photograph of an anonymous man of Middle Eastern descent.2004 Racism Watch , Commondreams.org, March 31, 2004; retrieved January 14, 2014.

Friendships with other actors

William Daniels
When Begley was a child, his future St. Elsewhere series lead, William Daniels, met Begley's father when the two were working on live television. By the time Begley Jr. grew up, he was already a fan of his mentor's work; he would work with Daniels on St. Elsewhere, where the two had on- and off-screen chemistry for six seasons. Daniels, himself, on the show, was a moody Irishman like Ed Sr., though a far more nurturing father figure. This proved so rich that the role grew beyond even the writers' expectations. Begley Jr. said about his future TV chief of surgery, "I was a huge fan of Bill Daniels. I had seen him in Two for the Road. I had seen him in The Graduate, and in Parallax View. He was an actor I just thought the world of. He played these 'Type A' personalities quite effectively, but (in real life) he is the sweetest guy in the world." He also added: "He is an actor I just thought the world of. I had no delusions about how my character came to be. I rode on the coattails of Bill Daniels... the kind of Mutt and Jeff routine of Dr. Craig looking up and berating a 6 foot 4 doctor Victor Ehrlich. So I owe all my success on the show to Bill Daniels." After the series was canceled, the two still remained friends, living not too far away from each other. In 2002, Daniels, Begley Jr., along with the rest of the former surviving St. Elsewhere cast members, the late Stephen Furst and Eric Laneuville all appeared on an episode of Scrubs.

 Norman Lloyd 
Before St. Elsewhere in the early 1980s, the struggling and unknown Begley met Norman Lloyd, who became a mentor to him while Lloyd was directing an episode of Tales of the Unexpected. The two became friends. In a 2014 interview with Jimmy Falcon of Cloverleaf Radio, he said this about Lloyd: Not only did I enjoy working with him, but I see him fairly regularly. I just had dinner with him 4 nights ago.  We had dinner together at Sarah Nichols's house, his neighbor of mine and friend of his. We had a lovely time and reminisced – he's unbelievable. He's going to be 100 years old this year—and still very active, getting around on his own. He's a force of nature, so Norman Lloyd was somebody I idolized. When I was quite young, wow, James Dean is great and this is one and that.  Now look at Janis Joplin, what a great voice and Jim Morrison, those people left us so young, like my point of view has change somewhere, in the late 1970s and early 1980s, saying, 'No, you idolized Jimmy Stewart, Gloria Swanson.' The people that have families and happiness and a long, economy life. You know, Norman Lloyd, he wasn't much older than me, when I did St. Elsewhere, and I went 'These are my role models, now, people had a long/happy life and continued to be creative.' Those are my role models, not the people that left us so early and I'm sorry they did, I don't mean to trifle with that, but, my role models changed from the people who had an incredible, brief spurt of creativity and life, but to people that went the distance, they became my role models at some point in my early 30s really.

On November 9, 2014, along with former St. Elsewhere'' co-stars, Begley attended Lloyd's 100th birthday in Los Angeles. Begley said, "I worked with Norman Lloyd the actor, and Norman Lloyd the director, and no one informed me better on the art of storytelling than that talented man. He is a constant inspiration and my eternal friend."

Filmography

Film

Television

References

External links

 
 
 
 The TreeHugger Interview: Ed Begley Jr.
 Interview from Log Home Design magazine: Ed Begley Jr.
 Good Morning America covers Guide to Sustainable Living by Ed Begley Jr.

20th-century American male actors
21st-century American male actors
Activists from California
American environmentalists
American male film actors
American male television actors
American male voice actors
American people of Irish descent
American anti-racism activists
American veganism activists
Living people
Los Angeles Valley College people
Male actors from Los Angeles
Male actors from Buffalo, New York
Notre Dame High School (Sherman Oaks, California) alumni
People from Santa Monica, California
1949 births